The Mississippi Storm was an American soccer team, based in the Biloxi suburb of Ocean Springs, Mississippi, which competes in National Premier Soccer League (NPSL). The Mississippi Storm withdrew from the NPSL and folded in 2014.

History
On October 7, 2012, the NPSL accepted the Storm as one of the expansion clubs for their 2012 season.

Stadium
 Greyhound Stadium (2012–present)

The Storm plays their home games at Greyhound Stadium, also known as Hugh Pepper Field and Ocean Springs High School Stadium, in Ocean Springs, Mississippi on the campus of Ocean Springs High School.

Players and staff

Staff
  J. William Gronau – Head Coach
  Charles Alexander – General Manager

Record

Year-by-year

References

External links
Official website

National Premier Soccer League teams
Defunct soccer clubs in Mississippi
Sports in Biloxi, Mississippi
Association football clubs established in 2011
2011 establishments in Mississippi
Association football clubs disestablished in 2014
2014 disestablishments in Mississippi